Alexandria Public Schools may refer to:
Alexandria City Public Schools (Virginia)
Alexandria Public Schools (Minnesota)